300s may refer to:

Time
 The period from 300 to 399, almost synonymous with the 4th century (301–400)
 The period from 300 to 309, known as the 300s decade, almost synonymous with the 31st decade (301-310)
 300s BCE (century), the period from 399 BCE to 300 BCE, almost synonymous with the 4th century BCE
 300s BC (decade), the period from 309 BC to 300 BC

Other uses
 Maserati 300S, a racecar
 Extra 300S, an aerobatics airplane

See also

 
 
 300 series (disambiguation)
 S300 (disambiguation)
 300 (disambiguation)